T53, T.53, T 53 or T-53 may refer to:

 T53 (classification), a classification for disability athletics
 T 53-class destroyer, a post World War 2 French Navy destroyers class
 Hunter T 53, an export version of the Hunter T.7 trainer for Denmark, two built
 Cooper T53, a racing car manufactured by the Cooper Car Company
 Lycoming T53, a 1950s United States turboshaft engine used on helicopters and fixed-wing aircraft
 Slingsby T.53, a British-built, two-seat glider
 Mosin–Nagant Type 53, a Chinese copy of the Soviet Mosin-Nagant M44 carbine
 Cirrus T-53, a training aircraft operated by the United States Air Force